Suddenly is the fourth album by the North Carolina band Arrogance, released in 1980 (see 1980 in music).

Track listing
Side One
"Burning Desire" (Kirkland) – 3:42
"I'm Not Your Taxi" (Dixon) – 2:53
"Bad Girl" (Kirkland) – 2:48
"City Woman" (Kirkland) – 3:15
"Bring It On Home" (Dixon) – 4:00
Side Two
"Suddenly" (Kirkland) – 4:56
"What It Takes" (Abernethy) – 3:11
"Get Her Out Of My Life" (Kirkland) – 3:14
"It Ain't Cool To Be Cruel" (Kirkland) – 2:22
"Cost Of Money" (Stout) – 3:20

Personnel 
Arrogance
Don Dixon – bass, vocals
Robert Kirkland – guitars, vocals
Marty Stout – keyboards
Rod Abernethy – guitar, vocals
Scott Davison – drums, vocals

References

Arrogance (band) albums
1980 albums
Curb Records albums